North Dakota Highway 200 (ND 200) is a major east–west state highway in North Dakota, United States. It runs from Minnesota State Highway 200 at the Minnesota border near Halstad, Minnesota to Montana Highway 200 near Fairview, Montana.

This highway was originally numbered North Dakota Highway 7, but was renumbered to form a continuous chain of similarly numbered state highways that stretch from Minnesota to Idaho.

Route description

Major intersections

See also

 List of state highways in North Dakota
 List of highways numbered 200

References

External links

 The North Dakota Highways Page by Chris Geelhart

200
Theodore Roosevelt Expressway